Didier Niquet (born July 22, 1949) is a French sprint canoer who competed in the early 1970s. He finished sixth in the K-2 1000 m event at the 1972 Summer Olympics in Munich.

References
Sports-reference.com profile

External links

1949 births
Canoeists at the 1972 Summer Olympics
French male canoeists
Living people
Olympic canoeists of France
Place of birth missing (living people)
20th-century French people